Maying may refer to:

Places

In China
Gansu
Maying, Longnan (马营), a town in Longnan
Maying, Tongwei County (马营), a town in Tongwei County

Qinghai
Maying, Minhe County (马营), a town in Minhe Hui and Tu Autonomous County
Maying Township, Haidong (马营乡), a township in Haidong

Other provinces
Maying Township, Hebei (马营乡), a township in Chicheng County, Hebei
Maying, Jiangxi (马影), a town in Hukou County, Jiangxi
Maying, Shaanxi (马营), a town in Baoji, Shaanxi
Maying, Shandong (马营), a town in Liangshan County, Shandong
Maying Township, Shanxi (马营乡), a township in Shanyin County, Shanxi
Maying Township, Sichuan (麻英乡), a township in Wangcang County, Sichuan

People
 Wong May Ing (WONG Maying), Malaysian politician

Other uses
Maying, celebration of May Day, as in "Now Is the Month of Maying"

See also
Ma Ying (disambiguation) for people
May (disambiguation) 
Ing (disambiguation) 
Ying (disambiguation) 
Ma (disambiguation)